Paolo Zimengoli or Cimengoli (active 1717 -1720) was an Italian painter of the Baroque style, active in his native Verona and Bergamo.

He was a figure painter, mainly of sacred subjects, including a frescoed lunette in the crypt of the church of San Stefano, in Sant'Andrea di Romagnano, and in the church of San Marco. It is unclear who was his master.

References

Year of birth unknown
Year of death unknown
18th-century Italian painters
Italian male painters
Painters from Verona
Italian Baroque painters
18th-century Italian male artists